West Oneonta is a hamlet in Otsego County, New York, United States. According to the 2010 U.S. Census, West Oneonta had a population of 319.
West Oneonta has a post office with ZIP code 13861.

References

Hamlets in Otsego County, New York
Hamlets in New York (state)